Slovenia has been competing as an independent country at the Summer Paralympic Games since the 1992 Games in Barcelona. Slovenian athletes have won a total of four gold, ten silver and ten bronze medals.

Since 2008, Slovenian medal winners at the Paralympics receive a financial reward equal to that received by Olympic medal winners.

Medalists

See also
 Slovenia at the Olympics

References